Agios Georgios Nileias is a village and a community in the municipal unit of Milies, Magnesia, Greece. It is situated on the slopes of mount Pelion, at about 700 m elevation. Its population in 2001 was 142 for the village, and 963 for the community.  Agios Georgios Nileias is 1.5 km east of Agios Vlasios, 3 km northwest of Pinakates, 6 km northwest of Milies and 13 km east of Volos. Agios Georgios Nileias has a municipal museum with works of the sculptor Nikolaos Pavlopoulos.

Subdivisions
The community Agios Georgios Nileias consists of the following villages:
Agios Georgios, elevation: 700 m, population as of 2011: 142 (population of 1971: 109)
Agia Triada, elevation: 500 m, pop.: 141 (pop. 1971: 263)
Ano Gatzea, elevation: 150 m, pop.: 297 (pop. 1971: 382)
Dyo Revmata, elevation: 500 m, pop.: 23 (pop. 1971: unknown)
Kato Gatzea, seaside settlement, pop.: 360 (pop. 1971: 324)

Population

History
According to tradition, the village was founded by shepherds who found an icon in a bush. Its inhabitants lived in the village in the summer and in the winter they moved to villages at lower elevations, such as Agia Triada, Ano Gatzea and Kato Gatzea. The village revolted during the Greek War of Independence of 1821, but the revolt was suppressed by the Ottoman Pasha Dramali and the village was burnt. Agios Georgios joined the rest of Greece in 1881. The village became a part of the municipality of Nileia (named after the ancient city Nelia, located close to modern Volos), which was dissolved in 1914. Agios Georgios Nileias was an independent community from 1914 until 1998, when it became part of the municipality Milies.

Notable people
Yiannis Poulakas (1863–1942) painter
Nikolaos Pavlopoulos (1909–1990) sculptor and writer

See also
List of settlements in the Magnesia regional unit

References
Kostas Liapis, O megalos Ai-Giorgis tou Piliou'', published by the old Commune of Agios Georgios Nileias, Volos 1994, 515 pages 

Notes

External links
 Agios Georgios Nileias on GTP Travel Pages

Dissolved municipalities and communes in Greece
Populated places in Pelion